Stary Wylezin  is a village in the administrative district of Gmina Kowiesy, within Skierniewice County, Łódź Voivodeship, in central Poland.

References

Stary Wylezin